MGS may refer to:

Schools
 Maidstone Grammar School, Kent, England, UK
 Manchester Grammar School, England, UK
 Mayo Clinic Graduate School of Biomedical Sciences, U.S.
 Melbourne Grammar School, Australia
 Meldorfer Gelehrtenschule, Germany
 Middleton Grange School, New Zealand

Science
 Magnesium sulfide, an inorganic chemical compound
 Mars Global Surveyor, an American spacecraft launched in 1996
 Medial gastrocnemius strain, an injury of the gastrocnemius muscle in the calf
 Modelling of General Systems, a domain-specific language for biological systems
 Modified Gram-Schmidt, a mathematical method for orthogonalizing a set of vectors; see

Video games
 Metal Gear Solid, another name for the 1987 stealth action video game series Metal Gear
 Metal Gear Solid (1998 video game), a stealth action video game in the Metal Gear series

Other uses
 M1128 Mobile Gun System, an armored fighting vehicle
 Microsoft Game Studios, a multinational video game and digital entertainment company now called Xbox Game Studios
 MGS (TV station)

See also
 Methodist Girls' School (disambiguation)
 MG (disambiguation)